Mecyclothorax angusticollis is a species of ground beetle in the subfamily Psydrinae. It was described by Blackburn in 1878.

References

angusticollis
Beetles described in 1878